Ardimentoso has been borne by at least two ships of the Italian Navy and may refer to:

 , previously the German destroyer S63 awarded to Italy as war reparations by the Treaty of Versailles.
 , a  launched in 1942 and transferred to Russia under the designation Z 19 in 1949.

Italian Navy ship names